The 2016–17 Turkish Airlines EuroLeague was the 17th season of the modern era of Euroleague Basketball and the seventh under the title sponsorship of the Turkish Airlines. Including the competition's previous incarnation as the FIBA Europe Champions Cup, this was the 60th season of the premier level competition for European men's professional basketball clubs.

This was the first season in which the competition changed to a league format, with sixteen teams playing each other in a home-and-away round-robin competition. Regular season groups were abolished, as well as the Top 16 group stage. 

The Final Four was hosted by the Sinan Erdem Dome in Istanbul, Turkey. Fenerbahçe won its inaugural European championship in its home city after defeating Olympiacos in the final.

Format changes

In July 2015, FIBA tried to take the helm of the EuroLeague, by trying to convince eight of the eleven teams with an A-Licence to play in a new competition organized by FIBA instead of the current EuroLeague. This proposal was unanimously rejected by the EuroLeague clubs. In October 2015, FIBA attempted to take back control of Europe's first tier club competition, by proposing that the Basketball Champions League become Europe's new 1st tier competition, with 16 teams playing in a round-robin format, granting eight guaranteed spots to different clubs.

In November 2015, Euroleague Basketball agreed to a 10-year joint venture with IMG. In its press release, the EuroLeague announced a new competition format for the 2016–17 season, with only 16 teams, including the eleven licensed clubs (Anadolu Efes, Baskonia, CSKA Moscow, FC Barcelona, Fenerbahçe, Maccabi Tel Aviv, Olimpia Milan,  Olympiacos, Panathinaikos, Real Madrid, and Žalgiris).

The regular season features a single group with a double round-robin. The first eight qualified teams will then play in a best-of-five playoff round for qualification to the Final Four. As a result, the maximum number of games per team increased from 31 to 37.

Team allocation
A total of 16 teams participated in the 2016–17 EuroLeague. The labels in the parentheses show how each team qualified for the place of its starting round (TH: EuroLeague title holders). Eleven teams were placed as Licensed Clubs, long-term licenses, while five spots were given to Associated Clubs, based on merit.
LC: Qualified through a licensed club with a long-term licence
1st, 2nd, etc.: League position after Playoffs
EC: EuroCup champion
WC: Wild card

Notes

Teams
A total of 16 teams from nine countries contest the league, including 11 sides with a long-term licence from the 2015–16 season, one team qualified from the EuroCup, three highest-placed teams from ABA League, Germany and VTB United League and one team qualified with a wild card.

Brose Bamberg and Crvena zvezda mts qualified after clinching respectively the Bundesliga and ABA League titles. UNICS qualified as runner-up of the VTB United League. Galatasaray Odeabank qualified as the Eurocup champions and Darüşşafaka Doğuş qualified with a wild card.

Venues and locations

Personnel and sponsorship

Managerial changes

Regular season

League table

Results

Playoffs

Series

Final Four

The Final Four was the last phase of the season, and was held over a weekend. The Final Four was held at the Sinan Erdem Dome in Istanbul, Turkey on 19 and 21 May 2017.

Awards

EuroLeague MVP 
 Sergio Llull ( Real Madrid)

EuroLeague Final Four MVP 
 Ekpe Udoh ( Fenerbahçe)

All-EuroLeague Teams 

Source:

Alphonso Ford Top Scorer Trophy
  Keith Langford ( UNICS)

Best Defender
  Ádám Hanga ( Baskonia)

Rising Star
  Luka Dončić ( Real Madrid)

Magic Moment
  Anthony Randolph ( Real Madrid)

Round MVP

Regular season

Playoffs

MVP of the Month

Individual statistics

Rating

Points

Rebounds

Assists

Other statistics

Source: EuroLeague

Individual game highs

Source: EuroLeague

Attendances
Attendances include playoff games:

References

See also
2016–17 EuroCup Basketball
2016–17 Basketball Champions League
2016–17 FIBA Europe Cup

External links

Official website

EuroLeague seasons